Charaxes murphyi is a butterfly in the family Nymphalidae. It is found in northern Zambia and the south-eastern part of the Democratic Republic of the Congo. The habitat consists of riverine forests.

References

External links
Charaxes murphyi images at Consortium for the Barcode of Life

Butterflies described in 1989
murphyi